Saving Lincoln is a 2013 American historical drama film about Ward Hill Lamon, a friend of President Abraham Lincoln, and follows their overlapping legal careers in Illinois prior to the American Civil War.  Lamon accompanied Lincoln to Washington and served as the President's main bodyguard during the war, thwarting several assassination attempts while holding the post of US Marshal. Lincoln sent Lamon to Richmond, Virginia, on Reconstruction business a few days before April 14, 1865, the day that John Wilkes Booth assassinated the President.

The film was shot on a green screen stage, using the CineCollage technique invented by the director Salvador Litvak to create interior and exterior locations. Actors, extras, furniture, and props were filmed and combined with period photographs via the CineCollage process, which relied on off-the-shelf visual effects tools. The end result was a stylized look that reflects the movie's narrative structure, which involves Lamon's personal recollections of his friend. This was the first time such a technique was used to create an entire feature film. The film released on February 13, 2013.

Plot
Director Salvador Litvak and his writing partner, Nina Davidovich Litvak, based their screenplay on their extensive research into Lincoln's friendship with Lamon. Saving Lincoln charts their relationship from their initial meeting to Lincoln's Presidency. Lamon was a tall, boisterous Southerner who liked to drink whiskey, tell jokes and stories, play the banjo, and wrestle. Despite some pronounced differences between the two men, they shared a fondness for telling jokes and stories, and both felt slavery should be eliminated. Lamon often served as Lincoln's private confidant.

The film jumps from their initial meeting to Lincoln's presidency and the repeated attempts that were made on his life. Many well-known incidents are recounted, including the plot to kill Lincoln in Maryland, while he was traveling to Washington, D.C. after his first election – Lamon worked with Allan Pinkerton, who founded the famous Pinkerton Detective Agency, to thwart that plan. Other events include the time a bullet went through Lincoln's hat while he was riding his horse late one evening – he blamed it on a hunter firing an errant shot, but Lamon saw it as a sign that Lincoln was in mortal danger and needed even tighter security. Lamon was said to sometimes sleep by Lincoln's bedroom door, a striking image that appears in the film.

Themes in the story involve Lincoln's anguish over Civil War casualties, his conflicts with members of his cabinet, and the death of the Lincolns' son Willie, which drove Mary Todd Lincoln to the depths of despair. Such situations complicate Lamon's efforts to keep Lincoln safe.

Cast
 Tom Amandes as President Abraham Lincoln
 Lea Coco as Ward Hill Lamon
 Penelope Ann Miller as Mary Todd Lincoln
 Joshua Rush as Tad Lincoln
 Bruce Davison as Secretary of State William H. Seward
 Creed Bratton as Senator Charles Sumner
 Josh Stamberg as Secretary of the Treasury Salmon P. Chase
 Robert Craighead as Secretary of War Edwin Stanton
 Michael Maize as Lincoln's former law partner William Herndon
 Saidah Arrika Ekulona as Mrs. Elizabeth Keckley
 Lew Temple as Montgomery Blair
 Steven Brand as Ned Baker
 Adam Croasdell as Col. Elmer Ellsworth
 Elijah Nelson as Willie Lincoln
 Michael Shamus Wiles as Cranston Laurie
 Matthew Del Negro as Nathaniel Rulough
 Peter O'Meara as General Ulysses S. Grant
 Marcus Freed as Allan Pinkerton

Reception
On review aggregator Rotten Tomatoes, the film holds an approval rating of 27% based on 15 reviews, with an average rating of 4.64/10. On Metacritic, the film has a weighted average score of 21 out of 100, based on 9 critics, indicating "generally unfavorable reviews".

References

External links
 
 Movie City News – “SAVING LINCOLN” Finishes Post-Production Process
 / Salvador Litvak talks Saving Lincoln with The Straight Hype 

2013 films
American biographical drama films
2013 biographical drama films
American Civil War films
Abraham Lincoln in art
Films about Abraham Lincoln
2013 drama films
2010s English-language films
2010s American films